Choices is a 2021 Indian Hindi-language romantic drama film directed by Damini Kanwal Shetty and Raaj Shetty and written by Damini Kanwal Shetty. The film is produced by Damini Kanwal Shetty and Raaj Shetty under Eternal Flame Production's, the film is based on lockdown. It stars Indraneil Sengupta and Barkha Bisht Sengupta with Karan Veer Mehra and Deeksha Sonalkar making cameo appearances. The film is released on OTT platform on MX Player.

Plot 
The film is all about lockdown; the couple has stuck in lockdown severely with no choice. The dark humour has been portrayed the relationship between a couple suddenly challenged under lockdown due to a minuscule virus, how their normal and happy life has become unhappy on daily basis.

Cast and Crew
The main casts of the movie are Indraneil Sengupta, Barkha Bisht Sengupta, Karan Veer Mehra and Deeksha Sonalkar. The producer and director are Damini Kanwal Shetty  and  Raaj Shetty, the music is composed by Dony Hazarika and Raagini Kavathekar and edited by Sankalp Sehgal.

Songs

References

External links 
 

2021 films
Indian romantic drama films
2020s Hindi-language films
MX Player original programming
2021 romantic drama films